Manuel Ortlechner (born 4 March 1980) is a former Austrian footballer. He previously played for SK Austria Kärnten, SV Pasching, SV Ried and for youth teams of TSV Ort. He was a member of the Austria national football team.

Coaching career
On 17 June 2015, Ortlechner became a player–coach for Austria Wien. He signed a playing contract for the reserve team and is also an assistant coach for the club's under–14 team.

References

External links
 
 Official Austrian FA website

Austrian footballers
Austria international footballers
SV Ried players
FK Austria Wien players
1980 births
Living people
Austrian Football Bundesliga players
FK Austria Wien non-playing staff

Association football defenders